Terence Lewis (born 29 December 1935), known as Terry Lewis, is a politician in the United Kingdom. He was educated at Mount Carmel School, Salford and did his National Service in the Royal Army Medical Corps before becoming a Personnel Officer. He was elected as the Labour Member of Parliament for Worsley, Greater Manchester in 1983. He retired at the 2005 general election, being succeeded by Barbara Keeley of Labour.

In 2010 Lewis announced his resignation from the Labour Party, saying that it had 'lost its soul'.

References

1935 births
Living people
Labour Party (UK) MPs for English constituencies
Transport and General Workers' Union-sponsored MPs
UK MPs 1983–1987
UK MPs 1987–1992
UK MPs 1992–1997
UK MPs 1997–2001
UK MPs 2001–2005
Royal Army Medical Corps officers
20th-century British Army personnel